Jef Caers, born in Belgium, is an academic working as a Professor at the School of Earth, Energy & Environmental Sciences, Stanford University. He was awarded the Andrei Borisovich Vistelius Research Award and the William Christian Krumbein Medal by the International Association for Mathematical Geosciences in 2001 and 2014 respectively. He is Editor-in-Chief of Computers & Geosciences.

Education
Ph.D. in engineering, 1997, Katholieke Universiteit Leuven, Belgium
M.S. in Mining Engineering & Geophysics, 1993, Katholieke Universiteit Leuven, Belgium

Research
His research interests include geostatistics, spatial modeling and modeling uncertainty.

Employment

2015–Present, Professor, Department of Geological Sciences, Stanford University
2014–2015, Professor, Energy Resources Engineering, Stanford University
2006–2013, Associate Professor, Energy Resources Engineering, Stanford University
2000–Present, Director, Stanford Center for Reservoir Forecasting, Stanford University
1999–2005, Assistant Professor, Petroleum Engineering, Stanford University
1997–1999, Postdoctoral Scholar, Department of Geological and Environmental Sciences, Stanford University
1997, Post-doctoral researcher, Department of Civil Engineering, University of Calgary, Canada
1997–1999, Post-doctoral Fellow of the National Science Foundation of Belgium
1997–1998, Research Fellow of the NATO

Selected books
Jef Caers, 2005, "Petroleum Geostatistics”, Society for Petroleum Engineers, p. 96.
Jef Caers, 2011, “Modeling Uncertainty in the Earth Sciences”, (Wiley-Blackwell), p. 246.
G. Mariethoz and Jef Caers, 2014, "Multiple-point Geostatistics: stochastic modeling with training images", Wiley-Blackwell, p. 400.

References

Year of birth missing (living people)
Living people
KU Leuven alumni
Stanford University faculty